The following outline is provided as an overview of and topical guide to Bolivia:

Bolivia – landlocked sovereign country located in central South America. Bolivia is bordered on the north and the east by Brazil, on the southeast by Paraguay, on the south by Argentina, and on the west by Chile and Peru. Its geography varies from the peaks of the Andes mountains to the tropical forests of the Amazon Basin. It is a developing country, and its main economic activities include agriculture, mining, and manufacturing of products such as textiles.

General reference

 Pronunciation:
 Common English country name:  Bolivia
 Official English country name:  The Plurinational State of Bolivia
 Adjective: Bolivian  
 Demonym(s):
 Etymology: Name of Bolivia
 International rankings of Bolivia
 ISO country codes:  BO, BOL, 068
 ISO region codes:  See ISO 3166-2:BO
 Internet country code top-level domain:  .bo

Geography of Bolivia 

Geography of Bolivia
 Bolivia is: a landlocked country
 Location:
 Southern Hemisphere
 Western Hemisphere
 South America
 Time zone:  UTC-04
 Extreme points of Bolivia
 High:  Nevado Sajama 
 Low:  Rio Paraguay 
 Land boundaries:  6,940 km
 3,423 km
 1,075 km
 860 km
 832 km
 750 km
 Coastline:  none
 Population: 9,119,152(2007) - 84th
 Area:  - 28th largest country
 Atlas of Bolivia

Environment of Bolivia 

Environment of Bolivia (currently redirects to "Environmental issues…")
 Climate of Bolivia
 Environmental issues in Bolivia
 Renewable energy in Bolivia
 Geology of Bolivia
 Protected areas of Bolivia
 Biosphere reserves in Bolivia
 National parks of Bolivia
 Wildlife of Bolivia
 Fauna of Bolivia
 Birds of Bolivia
 Mammals of Bolivia

Natural geographic features of Bolivia 
 Glaciers of Bolivia
 Islands of Bolivia
 Lakes of Bolivia
 Mountains of Bolivia
 Volcanoes in Bolivia
 Rivers of Bolivia
 World Heritage Sites in Bolivia

Regions of Bolivia 
Regions of Bolivia

Ecoregions of Bolivia 

List of ecoregions in Bolivia

Administrative divisions of Bolivia 
Administrative divisions of Bolivia
 Departments of Bolivia
 Provinces of Bolivia
 Municipalities of Bolivia

Departments of Bolivia 

Departments of Bolivia
Bolivia is divided into 9 departments These are (with their capitals indicated in parentheses):

Beni (Trinidad)
Chuquisaca (Sucre)
Cochabamba (Cochabamba)
La Paz (La Paz)
Oruro (Oruro)
Pando (Cobija)
Potosí (Potosí)
Santa Cruz (Santa Cruz de la Sierra)
Tarija (Tarija)

Provinces of Bolivia 

Provinces of Bolivia
Bolivia is divided into 100 provinces, which are listed by department below:
Beni Department
Cercado
Iténez
José Ballivián
Mamoré
Marbán
Moxos
Vaca Diez
Yacuma

Chuquisaca Department
Belisario Boeto
Hernando Siles
Jaime Zudáñez
Juana Azurduay de Padilla
Luis Calvo
Nor Cinti
Oropeza
Sud Cinti
Tomina
Yamparáez

Cochabamba Department
Arani
Arque
Ayopaya
Capinota
Carrasco
Cercado
Chapare
Esteban Arce
Germán Jordán
Mizque
Narciso Campero
Punata
Quillacollo
Tapacarí

La Paz Department
Abel Iturralde
Aroma
Bautista Saavedra
Caranavi
Eliodoro Camacho
Franz Tamayo
Gualberto Villarroel
Ingavi
Inquisivi
José Manuel Pando
Larecaja
Loayza
Los Andes
Manco Kapac
Muñecas
Nor Yungas
Omasuyos
Pacajes
Pedro Domingo Murillo
Sud Yungas

Oruro Department
Atahuallpa
Cercado
Eduardo Avaroa
Ladislao Cabrera
Poopó
Litoral
Nor Carangas
Pantaléon Dalence
Sajama
Saucarí

Pando Department
Abuná
Federico Román
Madre de Dios
Manuripi
Nicolás Suárez

Potosí Department
Alonso de Ibáñez
Antonio Quijarro
Bernardino Bilbao
Charcas
Chayanta
Cornelio Saavedra
Daniel Campos
José María Linares
Modesto Omiste
Nor Chichas
Nor Lípez
Rafael Bustillo
Sud Chichas
Sud Lípez
Tomás Frías

Santa Cruz Department
Andrés Ibáñez
Ángel Sandoval
Chiquitos
Cordillera
Florida
Gutierrez
Ichilo
Ignacio Warnes Province
José Miguel de Velasco
Manuel María Caballero
Ñuflo de Chávez
Obispo Santistevan
Vallegrande

Tarija Department
Aniceto Arce
Burnet O'Connor
Cercado
Eustaquio Méndez
Gran Chaco
José María Avilés

Municipalities of Bolivia 

Municipalities of Bolivia
 Capital of Bolivia: Sucre C.S.
 Cities of Bolivia

Demography of Bolivia 
Demographics of Bolivia

Government and politics of Bolivia 
Politics of Bolivia
 Form of government: presidential representative democratic republic
 Capital of Bolivia: Sucre
 Elections in Bolivia
 Political parties in Bolivia

Branches of government

Government of Bolivia
 Constitution of Bolivia
 Bolivian Constituent Assembly

Executive branch of the government of Bolivia 
 Head of state: President of Bolivia, Jeanine Áñez
 Head of government: President of Bolivia, Jeanine Áñez
 Cabinet of Bolivia

Legislative branch of the government of Bolivia 
 Plurinational Legislative Assembly (formerly National Congress of Bolivia) (bicameral)
 Upper house: Senate of Bolivia
 Lower house: Chamber of Deputies of Bolivia

Judicial branch of the government of Bolivia 

Court system of Bolivia
 Supreme Court of Bolivia - its judges are appointed for 10-year terms by the National Congress

Electoral branch of the government of Bolivia 
 Supreme Electoral Tribunal of Bolivia (formerly, National Electoral Court of Bolivia

Foreign relations of Bolivia 

Foreign relations of Bolivia
 Diplomatic missions in Bolivia
 Diplomatic missions of Bolivia

International organization membership 
The Republic of Bolivia is a member of:

Agency for the Prohibition of Nuclear Weapons in Latin America and the Caribbean (OPANAL)
Andean Community of Nations (CAN)
Food and Agriculture Organization (FAO)
Group of 77 (G77)
Inter-American Development Bank (IADB)
International Atomic Energy Agency (IAEA)
International Bank for Reconstruction and Development (IBRD)
International Civil Aviation Organization (ICAO)
International Criminal Court (ICCt)
International Criminal Police Organization (Interpol)
International Development Association (IDA)
International Federation of Red Cross and Red Crescent Societies (IFRCS)
International Finance Corporation (IFC)
International Fund for Agricultural Development (IFAD)
International Labour Organization (ILO)
International Maritime Organization (IMO)
International Monetary Fund (IMF)
International Olympic Committee (IOC)
International Organization for Migration (IOM)
International Organization for Standardization (ISO) (correspondent)
International Red Cross and Red Crescent Movement (ICRM)
International Telecommunication Union (ITU)
International Telecommunications Satellite Organization (ITSO)
Inter-Parliamentary Union (IPU)
Latin American Economic System (LAES)
Latin American Integration Association (LAIA)
Multilateral Investment Guarantee Agency (MIGA)
Nonaligned Movement (NAM)

Organisation for the Prohibition of Chemical Weapons (OPCW)
Organization of American States (OAS)
Permanent Court of Arbitration (PCA)
Rio Group (RG)
Southern Cone Common Market (Mercosur) (associate)
Unión Latina
Union of South American Nations (UNASUR)
United Nations (UN)
United Nations Conference on Trade and Development (UNCTAD)
United Nations Educational, Scientific, and Cultural Organization (UNESCO)
United Nations Industrial Development Organization (UNIDO)
United Nations Mission in Liberia (UNMIL)
United Nations Mission in the Central African Republic and Chad (MINURCAT)
United Nations Mission in the Sudan (UNMIS)
United Nations Operation in Cote d'Ivoire (UNOCI)
United Nations Organization Mission in the Democratic Republic of the Congo (MONUC)
United Nations Peacekeeping Force in Cyprus (UNFICYP)
United Nations Stabilization Mission in Haiti (MINUSTAH)
Universal Postal Union (UPU)
World Confederation of Labour (WCL)
World Customs Organization (WCO)
World Federation of Trade Unions (WFTU)
World Health Organization (WHO)
World Intellectual Property Organization (WIPO)
World Meteorological Organization (WMO)
World Tourism Organization (UNWTO)
World Trade Organization (WTO)

Law and order in Bolivia 
Law of Bolivia
 Constitution of Bolivia
 Crime in Bolivia
 Human rights in Bolivia
 LGBT rights in Bolivia
 Law enforcement in Bolivia

Military of Bolivia 
Military of Bolivia
 Command
 Commander-in-chief
 Forces
 Army of Bolivia
 Navy of Bolivia
 Air Force of Bolivia
 Military ranks of Bolivia

Local government in Bolivia 

Local government in Bolivia

History of Bolivia 

History of Bolivia
Timeline of the history of Bolivia
Current events of Bolivia

Culture of Bolivia 
Culture of Bolivia
 Architecture of Bolivia
 Cuisine of Bolivia
 Languages of Bolivia
 Media in Bolivia
 National symbols of Bolivia
 Coat of arms of Bolivia
 Flag of Bolivia
 National anthem of Bolivia
 People of Bolivia
 Prostitution in Bolivia
 Public holidays in Bolivia
 Religion in Bolivia
 Christianity in Bolivia
 Hinduism in Bolivia
 Islam in Bolivia
 Judaism in Bolivia
 World Heritage Sites in Bolivia

Art in Bolivia 
 Cinema of Bolivia
 Literature of Bolivia
 Music of Bolivia

Sports in Bolivia 
Sports in Bolivia
 Football in Bolivia
 Bolivia at the Olympics

Economy and infrastructure of Bolivia 
Economy of Bolivia
 Economic rank, by nominal GDP (2007): 104th (one hundred and fourth)
 Agriculture in Bolivia
 Communications in Bolivia
 Internet in Bolivia
 Companies of Bolivia
Currency of Bolivia: Boliviano
ISO 4217: BOB
 Energy in Bolivia
 Health care in Bolivia
 Mining in Bolivia
 Tourism in Bolivia
 Transport in Bolivia
 Airports in Bolivia
 Rail transport in Bolivia
 Water supply and sanitation in Bolivia

Education in Bolivia 
Education in Bolivia

Health in Bolivia 

Health in Bolivia

See also 

Index of Bolivia-related articles
List of Bolivia-related topics
List of international rankings
Member state of the United Nations
Outline of geography
Outline of South America

References

External links

Government
 Agencia Para el Desarrollo de la Sociedad de la Informacion en Bolivia Agency for the Development of the Society of Information in Bolivia. Official web portal of the Bolivian Government.
 Presidencia de la Republica de Bolivia Office of the President of the Republic of Bolivia.
 Vicepresidencia de la Republica de Bolivia, Presidencia del Congreso Nacional Web portal of the Office of the Vice-President of the Republic of Bolivia, President of the Senate and President of the Commission of Congress.
 Poder Judicial de la Republica de Bolivia Web portal of the Bolivian Judicial Branch, which includes the Supreme Court of Bolivia, Constitutional Court, Agrarian Tribunal, Superior Courts and Judicial Council.
 Congreso Nacional de la Republica de Bolivia Web portal of the Bolivian National Congress, which includes the Presidency of the National Congress, the National Senate and the House of Representatives.
 Corte Nacional Electoral Web portal of the National Electoral Court of Bolivia. Electoral Organism of Bolivia.
 Asamblea Constituyente de la Republica de Bolivia Web portal of the Constituent Assembly of Bolivia.
 Instituto Nacional de Estadistica Web portal of the Statistics National Institute of Bolivia.

General information
 Public Opinion in Bolivia
 Election Tracker-Bolivia
Bolivia-Online.net Information about Bolivia
 Encyclopædia Britannica - Bolivia's Country Page
 Congressional Research Service (CRS) Reports regarding Bolivia
The Spitting Llama Bookstore Maps and Books on Bolivia
 Bolivia Information Forum - news and background information
 Annotated map of Bolivia
 The Carter Center information on Bolivia

Military
 Ministerio de Defensa de Bolivia Ministry of Defense.
 Ejército

Native culture
 'Coca is a way of life' (The Guardian's article)
 Project to strengthen the culture and the self reliance of the indigenous tribes of the Yuracaré and Trinitario

Health
 Virtual Library of Public Health

Bolivia